Gradiške Laze is a small settlement to the east of Litija in central Slovenia. It belongs to the Municipality of Šmartno pri Litiji. The area is part of the historical region of Lower Carniola and is now included in the Central Slovenia Statistical Region.

References

External links
Gradiške Laze at Geopedia

Populated places in the Municipality of Šmartno pri Litiji